Hrebenne  is a village in the administrative district of Gmina Horodło, within Hrubieszów County, Lublin Voivodeship, in southeastern Poland, close to the border with Ukraine.

References

Villages in Hrubieszów County